Ugia disjungens is a species of moth in the family Erebidae. It is found in Thailand, Malaysia and Singapore and on Borneo.

References

Moths described in 1858
Ugia